The Miss Maryland competition is the pageant that selects the representative for the state of Maryland in the Miss America pageant.

Kayla Willing of Deal Island was crowned Miss Maryland 2022 on June 25, 2022 at Maryland Theatre in Hagerstown, Maryland. She competed at the Miss America 2023 competition at the Mohegan Sun in Uncasville, Connecticut in December 2022 where she won the Jean Bartel Military Awareness award.

Past titleholders

Results summary
Results of Miss Maryland titleholders at the national Miss America pageants/competitions. The year in parentheses indicates the year of the national competition, not the year attached to the contestant's state title.

 1st runners-up: Virginia Cha (1990)
 3rd runners-up: Keri L. Schrader (2000), Marina Harrison (2004)
 4th runners-up: Camille Lewis (2003)
 Top 7: Hannah Brewer (2017)
 Top 10: Georgia Reed (1952), Ingrid Christine Larson (1968), Kathleen Louise Neff (1973), Barbara Jean Jennings (1977), Tamara Alaine Walker (1988), Christina Denny (2014), Joanna Guy (2013)
 Top 12: Frances Stine (1935)
 Top 13: Virginia Lee Van Sant (1945)
 Top 20: Kelly Glorioso (2002)

Awards

Preliminary awards
 Preliminary Lifestyle & Fitness: Shelly Meg Peiken (1980), Jade Kenny (2015), Hannah Brewer (2017)
 Preliminary Talent: Beverly Anne Smith (1963) (tie), Debra Renea Fries (1992), Camille Lewis (2003), Joanna Guy (2013)

Non-finalist awards
 Non-finalist Talent: Linda Rita Peluzzo (1967), Veronica Marie Clarke (1976), Lisa Marie Daskal (1981), Debra Renea Fries (1992), Heather Noelle Davis (1999), Destiny Clark (2016)

Other awards
 Miss Congeniality: N/A
 Charles and Theresa Brown Scholarship: Joanna Guy (2013), Hannah Brewer (2017)
 Dr. & Mrs. David B. Allman Medical Scholarship: Barbara Jean Jennings (1977)
 Equity & Justice Scholarship Award Finalists: Caitlyn Stupi (2020)
 Jean Bartel Military Awareness Award: Kayla Willing (2023)
 Quality of Life Award Winners: Heather Noelle Davis (1999)
 Quality of Life Award 1st runners-up: Kelly Glorioso (2002), Joanna Guy (2013), Adrianna David (2019)
 Quality of Life Award 2nd runners-up: Jade Kenny (2015), Hannah Brewer (2017)
 Quality of Life Award Finalists: Lindsay Staniszewski (2011), Destiny Clark (2016)
 Women in Business Scholarship Award Finalists: Hannah Brewer (2017), Kathleen Masek (2018)

Winners

References

External links
 Miss Maryland official website

Maryland culture
Maryland
Women in Maryland
Recurring events established in 1921
1921 establishments in Maryland
Annual events in Maryland